Love Is Love/Return to Dust is the debut album by the American hardcore punk band Code Orange Kids. The album was released on November 20, 2012 through Deathwish Inc. A music video for the song "Flowermouth (The Leech)" was released in October 2012.

The first pressing of the album, limited to 3,000 copies, sold out within the first few weeks of release.

Critical reception

According to AbsolutePunk's Adam Pfleider, the record "tetters the line of sheer terror and savant variation in the context of the larger scale of contemporary hardcore - however you may define it." David Von Bader of Consequence of Sound wrote: "If the album is a sign of things to come, Deathwish has yet again located and presented the best in artistically relevant heavy music."

Love Is Love/Return to Dust ranked at number 23 on AbsolutePunk's top 30 albums of 2012 list, at number 2 on The A.V. Club's metal column Loud's "best metal, punk, and hardcore of 2012" list and also appeared on The Boston Phoenixs list of top metal albums of 2012.

Track listing

Personnel
Love Is Love/Return to Dust personnel according to CD liner notes.Code Orange Kids Eric Balderose – guitar, vocals
 Joe Goldman – bass, vocals
 Reba Meyers – guitar, vocals
 Jami Morgan – drums, vocalsGuest musicians Adam McIlwee (Tigers Jaw & Wicca Phase Springs Eternal) – vocals on "Colors (Into Nothing)"
 Mike McKenzie (The Red Chord) – vocals on "Bloom (Return to Dust)"Production Kurt Ballou – recording, mixing, engineering
 Carl Saff – masteringArtwork and design'
 Katie Krulock – photography
 Kimi Hanauer – artwork, photography

References

External links
 

2012 debut albums
Code Orange (band) albums
Deathwish Inc. albums
Albums produced by Kurt Ballou